Jennifer Kelchner is an American para-alpine skier. She represented the United States at the 1998 Winter Paralympics and at the 2002 Winter Paralympics in alpine skiing.

In 1998 she won the gold medal in the Women's Downhill LW3,4,6/8 event and in 2002 she won the bronze medal in the Women's Slalom LW3,4,9 event.

References 

Living people
Year of birth missing (living people)
Place of birth missing (living people)
Paralympic alpine skiers of the United States
American female alpine skiers
Alpine skiers at the 1998 Winter Paralympics
Alpine skiers at the 2002 Winter Paralympics
Medalists at the 1998 Winter Paralympics
Medalists at the 2002 Winter Paralympics
Paralympic gold medalists for the United States
Paralympic bronze medalists for the United States
Paralympic medalists in alpine skiing
21st-century American women